Mikhail Yurievich Yakubov (born February 16, 1982) is a Russian former professional ice hockey center who is currently an assistant coach for the Chicago Cougars of the United States Premier Hockey League. He last played with HC Sochi of the Kontinental Hockey League (KHL). Yakubov was drafted 10th overall by the Chicago Blackhawks in the 2000 NHL Entry Draft.

In 2006, he won Pajulahti Cup and in 2007 won Turnir Puchkova with the Severstal Cherepovets.

Career statistics

Regular season and playoffs

International

Awards and honours

External links

1982 births
Living people
Chicago Blackhawks draft picks
Chicago Blackhawks players
Florida Panthers players
HC Lada Togliatti players
Metallurg Magnitogorsk players
National Hockey League first-round draft picks
Norfolk Admirals players
Sportspeople from Barnaul
Red Deer Rebels players
Russian ice hockey centres
Severstal Cherepovets players
HC Sochi players
HC Spartak Moscow players
HC Yugra players
HC Vityaz players